Luiz Antônio Fleury Filho (30 March 1949 – 15 November 2022) was a Brazilian politician, prosecutor and professor. He was the governor of São Paulo from 15 March 1991 until 1 January 1995.

Fleury Filho died in São Paulo on 15 November 2022, at the age of 73.

References 

1949 births
2022 deaths
Brazilian Democratic Movement politicians
Brazilian Labour Party (current) politicians
Governors of São Paulo (state)
Members of the Chamber of Deputies (Brazil) from São Paulo
20th-century Brazilian politicians
21st-century Brazilian politicians